Nurse is an Old French surname, originally denoting the occupation of a name bearer, but eventually becoming hereditary. Early uses were recorded in England in the 14th century and later. Today, the surname is most common in the United States, the United Kingdom, Canada, and the Caribbean. Smaller populations exist in Australia, New Zealand, and South Africa.

Notable people with the surname include
Ashley Nurse (born 1988), West Indian cricketer
Charles George Nurse (1862–1933), English soldier and naturalist
Chris Nurse (born 1984), Guyanese footballer
Cristy Nurse (born 1986), Canadian rower
Dan Nurse (1874–1959), English footballer
Darnell Nurse (born 1995), Canadian ice hockey player
David Nurse (born 1976), English footballer
David Nurse (rugby league) (born 1991), Australian rugby league footballer
Denise Nurse (born 1976), British weather presenter
George Nurse (VC) (1873–1945), Irish soldier
George Nurse (footballer) (born 1999), English footballer
Jon Nurse (born 1981), Barbadian football player
Jonathan Nurse (cricketer) (1885–??), Guyanese cricketer
Josh Nurse (born 1996), American football player
Kia Nurse (born 1996), Canadian basketball player
Lee Nurse (1976–2020), English cricketer
Martin Nurse (born 1985), Barbadian cricketer
Mel Nurse (born 1937), Welsh football player 
Nick Nurse (born 1967), American basketball coach
Paul Nurse (born 1949), British biochemist
Phil Nurse (born 1963), British kick-boxer
Rebecca Nurse (1621–1692), English accused witch
Richard Nurse (born 1966), Canadian football player
Roberto Nurse (born 1983), Mexican footballer
Rohan Nurse (born 1983), Barbadian cricketer
Roy Nurse, New Zealand rugby league footballer
Rupert Nurse (1910–2001), Trinidadian musician
Ryan Nurse (born 1983), Barbadian cricketer
Sarah Nurse (born 1995), Canadian ice hockey player
Seymour Nurse (1933–2019), Barbadian cricketer
Trevor Nurse (1965–2016), Scottish darts player
Ty Nurse (born 1990), Canadian basketball player
Tyrone Nurse (born 1990), British boxer
William Nurse (1832–1885), New Zealand politician
Zephany Nurse (born 1997), South African social figure

See also
Nurse (disambiguation), a disambiguation page for Nurse

Notes

English-language surnames
Surnames of French origin